Jakob Lass (born 1981) is a German film director, screenwriter, producer, and actor known for his award-winning 2013 comedy drama film , which won New German Cinema Award, Max Ophüls Prize and German Film Award. His debut film was the 2007 short film Bademeister Paul. His most well-received films include the drama films Frontalwatte (2011) and Tiger Girl (2017). His upcoming film Right Here Right Now is scheduled to be released in December 2017.

References

External links

 

1981 births
Living people
Film people from Munich